Alfred Sully (May 22, 1820 – April 27, 1879), was a military officer during the American Civil War and during the Indian Wars on the frontier. He was also a noted painter.

Biography 

Sully was the son of the portrait painter, Thomas Sully, of Pennsylvania. Alfred Sully graduated from West Point in 1841. During and after the American Civil War, Sully served in the Plains States and was widely regarded as an Indian fighter. Sully, like his father, was a watercolorist and oil painter. Between 1849 and 1853, he became chief quartermaster of the U.S. troops at Monterey, California, after California came under American jurisdiction.  Then, Sully created a number of watercolor and some oil paintings reflecting the social life of Monterey during that period.

Commands 
Sully headed US troops out of Ft. Leavenworth, Kansas, in June 1861 as captain and occupied the city of St Joseph, Missouri, declaring martial law. Violent secessionist uprisings in the city during the early Civil War prompted Sully's occupation.

Sully was commissioned colonel of the 1st Minnesota Volunteer Infantry on February 3, 1862. He led his regiment during the Peninsula Campaign, sustaining a minor wound at Glendale. Sully was promoted to brigadier general on September 26 and led a brigade in the II Corps during the Battle of Chancellorsville, but on May 1, 1863, was removed from command by his division commander, Brig. Gen John Gibbon after failing to suppress a mutiny by the 34th New York when several of its companies refused to fight on the grounds that their two-year enlistment term was about to expire. Gibbon attempted to have Sully court-martialed for dereliction of duty, although a court of inquiry found him innocent of these charges, he was removed from command of his brigade and exiled to the Great Plains, never to serve in the Civil War again.

After being relieved of command, Sully went west and gained notoriety for committing several massacres against natives. On September 3, 1863, at Whitestone Hill, Dakota Territory, as reprisal for the Dakota Conflict of 1862, his troops destroyed a village of some 500 tipis that lodged Yankton, Dakota, Hunkpapa and Sihasapa Lakota. Warriors, along with women and children, were killed or captured. The troopers' casualties were small.
On June 28, 1864, in response to the killing of his science officer and topographical engineer, Captain John Feilner, while conducting a field survey, Sully ordered the heads of those Indians believed responsible hung from poles on a hill overlooking the Missouri River.
With the end of the Civil War, Sully's commission as a brigadier general expired and he reverted to the rank of major in the regular army. Despite frequent bouts of ill health, he continued serving in the Indian Wars until his death at Ft. Vancouver, Oregon, on April 27, 1879. The cause of death was ruled to be an aortic hemorrhage due to complications from an esophageal ulcer. Sully was buried in Laurel Hill Cemetery, Philadelphia.

Marriage 
Sully was married three times.

After the Mexican War, in 1851, Sully was posted as Quartermaster to the Presidio of Monterey, California, and married María Manuela Antonia Jimeno y de la Guerra. Tragically, soon after childbirth, Manuela died in 1852. Compounding the tragedy was the death of their newborn son, Thomas, 18 days later.

From September 1856 through May1857, Sully was posted to Fort Pierre, Nebraska Territory (now South Dakota). He met and, by Sioux tribal custom, married a young French-Yankton girl of the Yankton Sioux tribe. With this marriage, Sully became the son-in-law of Saswe, a.k.a. François Deloria (Saswe being the Dakota pronunciation of François), a powerful Yankton medicine man and chief of the "Half-Breed band".

In 1869, Sully married Sophia Henrietta Palmer in Manhattan, New York.

Descendants 
Sully's daughter by his Yankton Sioux wife, Mary Sully, was known as Akicita Win (Soldier Woman).  She married Rev. Philip Joseph Deloria, an Episcopal priest, a.k.a. Tipi Sapa (Black Lodge), a leader of the Yankton/Nakota band of the Sioux Nation. Tipi Sapa is featured as one of the 98 Saints of the Ages at the National Cathedral in Washington, D.C., as the first Dakota Christian minister to his own people. Among their descendants are Yankton Sioux Ella Deloria, an ethnologist, and her nephew Vine Deloria, Jr., a scholar, writer, author of Custer Died for Your Sins

References

External links 
Pictures of Alfred Sully
Portrait of Alfred Sully, a Cadet at West Point, 1839, by his father Thomas Sully
Alfred Sully Papers. Western Americana Collection, Beinecke Rare Book and Manuscript Library.

Further reading 
 Barth, Aaron L. "Imagining a Battlefield at a Civil War Mistake: The Public History of Whitestone Hill, 1863 to 2013." The Public Historian, Vol. 35, No. 3, pp. 72–97, University of California Press, August 2013. , electronic ISSN 1533-8576.
 Beck, Paul Norman.  “Columns of vengeance : soldiers, Sioux, and the Punitive Expeditions, 1863-1864” Norman, OK: University of Oklahoma Press, May 17, 2013. 
 Clodfelter, Micheal. “The Dakota War: The United States Army vs the Sioux, 1862-65”. McFarland Publishing Co. February 1, 1998. 
 Deloria, Vine, Jr. “Singing for a Spirit: A Portrait of the Dakota Sioux.” Clear Light Publishing (August 1, 1999). 
 Sully, Langdon. “No Tears for the General: The Life of Alfred Sully, 1821-1879” American West Publishing Co. (1974). 

People of Minnesota in the American Civil War
Dakota War of 1862
United States Military Academy alumni
United States Army generals
19th-century American painters
American male painters
Artists from Philadelphia
Burials at Laurel Hill Cemetery (Philadelphia)
Sully County, South Dakota
1820 births
1879 deaths
19th-century American male artists
Military personnel from Philadelphia